is a 1999 film based on the television Hissatsu series.

Cast
 Kiyoshi Nakajō as Yuji
 Yūki Amami as Otoyo
 Hiroshi Abe as Yasuke
 Yuko Natori as Otaki
 Makoto Fujita as Denbei
 Akira Nakao as Tokiya Tōubei
 Renji Ishibashi as Itamaki
 Hirotarō Honda as Asakichi
 Kentaro Shimizu as Uchida Heinai
 Naoko Ken as Oseki
 Sachiyo Nomura
 Shōhei Hino as Karasuma no Kengyō

References

1999 films
1990s adventure films
1990s Japanese-language films
Jidaigeki films
1990s Japanese films